World Conference may refer to:

 Mennonite World Conference, a global community of Anabaptist churches
 Pentecostal World Conference, a global fellowship of Pentecostal believers and denominations
 World Canals Conference, an annual conference about canals and other waterways worldwide established 1988
 World Climate Conference, a series of international meetings organized by the World Meteorological Organization
 World Conference (Community of Christ), the highest legislative body in the Community of Christ
 World Conference (World Association of Girl Guides and Girl Scouts)
 World Conference against Racism, a series of meetings established in 1978, convened by UNESCO
 World Conference of Religions for Peace
 World Conference on Breeding Endangered Species in Captivity as an Aid to their Survival
 World Conference on Disaster Reduction, a 2005 meeting convened by the United Nations
 World Conference on Human Rights, a 1993 meeting convened by the United Nations
 World Conference on Women (disambiguation), a series of meetings established 1975, convened by the United Nations
 World Food Conference, a 1974 meeting convened by the United Nations
 World Internet Conference
 World Radiocommunication Conference, to review and revise radio regulations
 World Religions Conference
 World Sanskrit Conference
 World Scout Conference, the governing body of the World Organization of the Scout Movement
 World Telugu Conference
 World Unity Conference

See also 
 World Assembly